William Nelson Camp Jr. House is a historic home site located at Fairview, Buncombe County, North Carolina. The complex consists of Rustic-style buildings constructed with native materials built about 1926. The main house is a -story, six bay, "L"-plan dwelling of log and frame construction.  Related contributing buildings and structures include the water storage building, garage, caretaker's cottage, two spring houses, and a barn.

It was listed on the National Register of Historic Places in 1998.

References

Houses on the National Register of Historic Places in North Carolina
Rustic architecture in North Carolina
Houses completed in 1926
Houses in Buncombe County, North Carolina
National Register of Historic Places in Buncombe County, North Carolina